A Perfect Day for Caribou is an experimental drama film directed by Jeff Rutherford that had its premiere at 2022 Locarno Film Festival. Starring Charlie Plummer and Jeb Berrier, it follows the routine of a father (Berrier) and his estranged son (Plummer) over the course of a day in the late 1990s.

Cast 
 Charlie Plummer as Nate
 Jeb Berrier as Herman

Reception 
The film received mostly positive reviews from critics with praise for its black and white cinematography, narrative and direction. In his review in Variety, Guy Lodge said that "fine performances by Charlie Plummer and Jeb Berrier anchor Jeff Rutherford's modest but refined debut feature about estranged men bound by malaise." Matthew Joseph Jenner of the International Cinephile Society wrote that the film was "a profound meditation on what it means to be a man, whether it be reflecting on the past, acknowledging the present, or anticipating the future."

John Bleasdale, writing for Dirty Movies, praised the film's cinematography and story, but felt the dialogue was weak and criticized Plummer's performance. In a review for High on Films, Arun Kumar awarded the film three and half out of four stars, with praise for its humor and restraint, comparing to the work of Jim Jarmusch.

References

External links 
 

2020s English-language films
2022 drama films
2022 films
American drama films
2020s American films